Braya linearis is a species of flowering plant belonging to the family Brassicaceae.

Is native range is Greenland, Norway, Sweden.

References

linearis